Black's Beach is a secluded section of beach beneath the bluffs of Torrey Pines on the Pacific Ocean in La Jolla, San Diego, California, United States. It is officially part of Torrey Pines State Beach. The northern portion of Black's Beach is owned and managed by the California Department of Parks and Recreation, while the southern portion of the beach, officially known as Torrey Pines City Beach, is jointly owned by the city of San Diego and the state park, but is managed by the city of San Diego. This distinction is important as Black's Beach is most known as a nude beach, a practice that is now prohibited in the southern portion managed by the city of San Diego.

Black's Beach was named for the Black family who had a horse ranch overlooking the beach. They sold the land, and then it was subdivided into La Jolla Farms lots. The Farms' residents retained the Black family's private road to the beach. Many mansions can be seen in the southern portion of the beach, including the Salk Mansion.  There is a funicular that goes all the way down from a mansion on the cliff to the beach into a structure known by locals as the mushroom house.

A submarine canyon funnels swells into Black's Beach, making it appealing to surfers but dangerous for inexperienced swimmers.
Usually, lifeguards are at the beach until 6:00 p.m., year round.
Due to budget cuts, lifeguard patrols were limited but have increased because of funding by UC San Diego. Stingrays can be found along the coastline when the water gets above 50 degrees.

Location
On the bluffs above Black's Beach are the Torrey Pines Gliderport, Torrey Pines Municipal Golf Course, Salk Institute for Biological Studies, and Torrey Pines State Reserve. To the north of Black's Beach lies the rest of Torrey Pines State Beach, which altogether stretches  from Del Mar, California, past the Los Peñasquitos Lagoon toward Scripps Beach. To the east of Black's Beach is the campus of the University of California, San Diego.

Nude beach
 Black's Beach in San Diego is one of the largest nude beaches in the United States and is popular with Southern Californian nudists and naturists. Originally including the current Torrey Pines State Beach, Black's Beach was the first and only public nude beach in the country for several years in the mid-1970s. Because Black's Beach was traditionally recognized as a clothing-optional beach, nudity is tolerated for the portion of the beach that is managed by the state park.  Until 1977, the city portion of Black's Beach was posted as "swimsuit optional"; in that year, nudity was prohibited on that part of the beach.

Surfing
The southern portion of Black's Beach is known to surfers as one of the most powerful surf breaks in Southern California. The waves gain their power due to the focusing effects of Scripps Canyon, an underwater canyon just offshore in the San Diego-La Jolla Underwater Park. Because of the sometimes large surf, fast breaking waves, and aggressive crowds, Black's is a dangerous surfing location, advisable for advanced surfers only.

Access
Black's Beach can be difficult to access due to its location beneath the Torrey Pines bluffs. Landslides can occur, with tragic results.  Beachgoers are warned to avoid setting up beach sites too close to the cliffs.
 There are four access routes to Black's Beach.

Torrey Pines Gliderport Trail – the most popular route to Black's Beach is via the trail from the Gliderport, located between the Torrey Pines Gliderport and the Salk Institute for Biological Studies. This steep rugged trail down the  cliffs is usually well maintained by local nudists of the beach, but the city of San Diego posted a “Do Not Use” sign there, as the Torrey Pines cliffs are unstable.  Visitors are advised to stay on the designated trails since many people have gotten stuck or even fallen to their deaths on the cliffs.

Torrey Pines State Beach – A  walk south from the parking lot at the base of Torrey Pines State Reserve, along the steep cliffs, and past Flatrock arrives at Black's Beach.

La Jolla Shores – If the tide is low, a  walk north from La Jolla Shores beach, past Scripps Pier and the rocky tidepools of Scripps Beach takes visitors to Black's Beach. The route is blocked at high tides. During low tide, it is also possible to walk from Torrey Pines State beach to Black's Beach.

See also
 List of beaches in San Diego County
 List of beaches in the United States
 List of social nudity organizations
 List of public outdoor clothes free places
 Naturism
 Nude beach
 Public nudity

References

External links 
 California State Parks: Torrey Pines State Beach webpage
 City of San Diego  - Black’s Beach page
 Cover story in the San Diego Reader about Black's Beach
  Naturist Society

Beaches of Southern California
La Jolla, San Diego
Nude beaches
Parks in San Diego County, California
Surfing locations in California
Geography of San Diego
Beaches of San Diego County, California